Rear Admiral Thomas John Ryan, Jr. (August 5, 1901 – January 28, 1970) was a career American naval officer who received the Medal of Honor, the United States' highest military decoration, for his actions while in Yokohama, Japan during the 1923 Great Kantō earthquake.  Ryan went on to serve in World War II as a destroyer flotilla commander.

Early life
Ryan was a 1921 graduate of the United States Naval Academy at Annapolis, Maryland.  While an ensign, he was in Yokohama, Japan during the 1923 Great Kantō earthquake, during which he saved a woman, Mrs. Slack, from the burning Grand Hotel. This action earned Ryan the Medal of Honor, making him one of 18 men to receive the Medal of Honor during the interwar period from 1920–1940.  Ryan was presented the Medal of Honor by President Calvin Coolidge at the White House on March 15, 1924.

World War II
During World War II, Captain Ryan served as a destroyer flotilla commander in the South Pacific while part of the Third Fleet under the command of Admiral William "Bull" Halsey and saw action during the Solomon Islands campaign.  He commanded the destroyer screen which supported the invasion of New Georgia in 1943, assisting the American landings on Rendova Island on June 30, by knocking out Japanese shore batteries.  In the Battle of Kolombangara two weeks later on July 12–13, he was in command of the rear echelon of destroyers as part of Rear Admiral Walden L. Ainsworth's Task Force 18.  A torpedo fired from Ryan's destroyers during the battle may have hit the Japanese cruiser Jintsu, which was sunk during the battle.

A month later, on August 17–18, Ryan led a group of destroyers which engaged a Japanese flotilla composed of destroyers, barges, and other light vessels under Rear Admiral Matsuji Ijuin which were attempting to reinforce the island of Horaniu near Vella Lavella.  Although Ryan succeeded in forcing the escorting enemy destroyers to retreat, most of the barge transports escaped.  After lying low the next day, on August 19, these barges landed a force of 390 Japanese on Horaniu, who succeeded in establishing a barge base.  However, this base was later captured by the Americans on September 14.

Postwar

After the end of the war, Ryan served as the trial judge advocate (prosecutor) in late 1945 during the court-martial of Charles B. McVay III. McVay, who had graduated from the Naval Academy a year ahead of Ryan in 1920, had been a friend of his for 25 years. McVay was convicted of "hazarding his ship by failing to zigzag", but was exonerated more than 50 years later in October 2000.

Ryan went on to reach the rank of rear admiral.  He died on January 28, 1970, and is buried at Arlington National Cemetery, in Arlington, Virginia.

Medal of Honor citation
His citation reads as follows:

For heroism in effecting the rescue of a woman from the burning Grand Hotel, Yokohama, Japan, on 1 September 1923. Following the earthquake and fire which occurred in Yokohama on 1 September, Ens. Ryan, with complete disregard for his own life, extricated a woman from the Grand Hotel, thus saving her life. His heroic conduct upon this occasion reflects the greatest credit on himself and on the U.S. Navy, of which he is a part.

See also

 List of Medal of Honor recipients
 List of Medal of Honor recipients in non-combat incidents

Notes

References

External links
 

United States Naval Academy alumni
United States Navy admirals
United States Navy Medal of Honor recipients
Burials at Arlington National Cemetery
1901 births
1970 deaths
People from New Orleans
Non-combat recipients of the Medal of Honor
United States Navy personnel of World War II